Tasmanophilus is a genus of two species of centipedes, in the family Zelanophilidae, which are found in the Australasian region. It was described by American biologist Ralph Vary Chamberlin in 1920.

Species
Valid species:
 Tasmanophilus opinatus (Newport, 1845)
 Tasmanophilus spenceri (Pocock, 1901)

References

 

 
 
Centipede genera
Animals described in 1920
Taxa named by Ralph Vary Chamberlin